This is a list of newspapers in Puerto Rico. Unless otherwise indicated, all papers are published in the Spanish language.

List of newspapers

Defunct newspapers

19th century

20th century

21st century

Diaspora/Exile newspapers
These are defunct papers not published in Puerto Rico for political reasons.

See also

 Media of Puerto Rico
 List of Spanish-language newspapers published in the United States
 
 Puerto Rican literature

Notes

References

Bibliography

in English

in Spanish
 
 
 El periodismo puertorriqueño desde su aparición hasta los comienzos del siglo XX. José S. Alegría. Instituto de Cultura Puertorriqueña. San Juan, Puerto Rico. 1960.

External links

 
 
 Online Newspapers: Puerto Rico Newspapers
  (List includes titles of newspapers published in Puerto Rico)
  (Directory ceased in 2017)
 
 
 
 American Newspaper Annual. N. W. Ayer & Son, publisher. Philadelphia. 1908.

Puerto Rico
Newspapers

Puerto Rico